Parajas is a parish (administrative division) in Allande, a municipality within the province and autonomous community of Asturias, in northern Spain. 

The population is 48. The postal code is 33815.

Villages and hamlets
 Argancinas
 Parajas ("Paraxas")

References

External links
 Allande 

Parishes in Allande